Feng Chu (born 1965) is a Chinese-French computer scientist and operations researcher whose research applies Petri nets to combinatorial optimization problems arising in inventory control, manufacturing, and transportation. She is a distinguished professor at the University of Évry Val d'Essonne, where she is co-director of the AROBAS (Algorithmics, Operational Research, Bioinformatics and Statistical Learning) team within the IBISC (Computer Science, Bio-Informatics and Complex Systems) laboratory, and head of the Chinese mission in the office of the president of the university.

Education
Chu graduated with a bachelor's degree in electrical engineering from Hefei University of Technology in China in 1986. After coming to France for graduate study, she earned a diplôme d'études approfondies (master's degree) in 1991 in metrology, automatic control and electrical engineering from the National Polytechnic Institute of Lorraine, and a doctorate in 1995 in automatic control, computer science, and production management from Paul Verlaine University – Metz; both institutions are now part of the University of Lorraine.

Career
She was a researcher for the French Institute for Research in Computer Science and Automation (INRIA) from 1992 to 1995, became a researcher and then maître de conférences at the University of Technology of Troyes from 2009, while earning a habilitation in 2006 through the University of Technology of Compiègne. She joined the University of Évry Val d'Essonne in 2009, and was named a distinguished professor (professeur de classe exceptionnelle des universités) in 2017. She also held a chair professorship at Hefei University of Technology from 2013 to 2018.

References

External links
Home page

1965 births
Living people
Chinese computer scientists
Chinese women computer scientists
French computer scientists
French women computer scientists
French operations researchers
Hefei University of Technology alumni
University of Lorraine alumni
Academic staff of the University of Évry Val d'Essonne